Veep is an American political satire television comedy series created by Armando Iannucci, as a U.S. spin of the premise of his 2005 BBC series, The Thick of It. The series premiered on HBO on April 22, 2012. Shot in a cinéma-vérité style, Veep stars Julia Louis-Dreyfus as Selina Meyer, the Vice President of the United States (or "Veep"), and later President of the United States, as she struggles to stay politically relevant.

Series overview

Episodes

Season 1 (2012)

Season 2 (2013)

Season 3 (2014)

Season 4 (2015)

Season 5 (2016)

Season 6 (2017)

Season 7 (2019)

Ratings

References

External links 
 
 

Veep (TV series)
Lists of American sitcom episodes